Deh-e Salman (also Romanized as Deh-e Salmān; also known as Salmān) is a village in Borborud-e Gharbi Rural District, in the Central District of Aligudarz County, Lorestan Province, Iran. At the 2006 census, its population was 66, in 11 families.

References 

Towns and villages in Aligudarz County